Murexsul leonardi is a species of sea snail, a marine gastropod mollusk in the family Muricidae, the murex snails or rock snails.

Description

Distribution
This marine species occurs off Christmas Island.

References

 Houart, R., 1993 – Three new species of Muricinae and Muricopsinae (Gastropoda: Muricidae) from Somalia, Christmas (Line Islands) and Philippines Islands- Venus, vol. 52(1), pp. 41–46

External links
 MNHN, Paris: Murexsul leonardi (holotype)

Muricidae
Gastropods described in 1993